Shallow water may refer to:

 Shallow Water (album)
 Shallow Water, Kansas, unincorporated community, United States
 Waves and shallow water
 Shallow water equations

See also
 Shallow-water blackout (disambiguation)